Acraea turlini is a butterfly in the family Nymphalidae. It is found in Rwanda. For taxonomy see Pierre & Bernaud, 2014

References

External links

Images representing  Acraea turlini at Bold

Butterflies described in 1979
turlini
Endemic fauna of Rwanda
Butterflies of Africa